Polonia Khmelnytskyi (Polish: Polonia Chmielnicki) is an Association football team, founded in 2007 by local members of Polish minority in Ukraine. Its hues are white-red-black, and the team’s chairman is Roman Medlakowski. The history of the team is closely associated with Municipal Association of Poles in Khmelnytskyi: a group, which had existed until 1992, to be recreated in 2007. Together with the Association, Polonia Khmelnytskyi was created in the same year. The team is financially supported by local Poles and Polish Consulate.

Sources 
 Polski klub piłkarski Polonia Chmielnicki, czyli kresowe granie

See also 
 List of football clubs in Ukraine
 Pogoń Lwów
 Poles in Ukraine

Football clubs in Khmelnytskyi Oblast
Ukraine
Polish diaspora in Ukraine
Polish association football clubs outside Poland
Sport in Khmelnytskyi, Ukraine